Christopher Boyadji (born 15 July 1990) is a retired French pair skater who represents Great Britain. With former partner Zoe Jones, he is a four-time British national champion (2017-2020). With former partner Amani Fancy, he is a two-time national champion (2014, 2016).

Career

For France 
Boyadji began skating at the age of 7½ after watching Philippe Candeloro on television. As a competitor in men's singles, he was coached by Diana Skotnická in Courbevoie and by Sylvain Privé. He represented France at five ISU Junior Grand Prix events and the 2009 Winter Universiade.

Boyadji competed with Camille Mendoza for France in the 2011–12 season. They finished 16th at the 2012 World Junior Championships in Minsk, Belarus. The pair trained in Paris and Montreal under Vivien Rolland and Diana Skotnická.

Partnership with Fancy 
Boyadji teamed up with British skater Amani Fancy in spring 2013. After winning the 2014 British national title, they were sent to the 2014 European Championships in Budapest, where they placed 15th. The pair finished 18th at the 2014 World Championships in Saitama, Japan.

Following an elbow surgery in November 2014, the pair was unable to compete at the 2015 British Championships. They were sent to the 2015 European Championships in Stockholm, where they placed 12th. The pair finished 16th at the 2015 World Championships in Shanghai.

Fancy/Boyadji won the bronze medal at the 2015 CS Tallinn Trophy and placed 8th at a Grand Prix event, the 2015 NHK Trophy, as well as winning their second national title. In January 2016, they announced the end of their partnership, withdrawing from both the 2016 European and 2016 World Championships.

Partnership with Jones 
Boyadji and Zoe Jones agreed to form a pair skating partnership following a tryout in April 2016. They trained at the Better Link Centre in Swindon. Their first competition was the 2016 CS Ondrej Nepela Memorial, where they finished 6th.

The pair retired after the 2021–22 figure skating season after having a career-best 10th-place finish at the 2022 World Figure Skating Championships.

Programs

With Jones

With Fancy

With Mendoza

Single skating

Competitive highlights 
GP: Grand Prix; CS: Challenger Series; JGP: Junior Grand Prix

With Jones for Great Britain

With Fancy for Great Britain

With Mendoza for France

Single skating for France

References

External links 

 
 
 

1990 births
Living people
French male pair skaters
British male pair skaters
French emigrants to England
Figure skaters from Paris
French male single skaters
Competitors at the 2009 Winter Universiade